Cardepia is a genus of moths of the family Noctuidae.

Species
 Cardepia affinis Rothschild, 1913
 Cardepia arenaria (Hampson, 1905)
 Cardepia arenbergeri Pinker, 1974
 Cardepia dardistana Boursin, 1967
 Cardepia halophila Hacker, 1998
 Cardepia hartigi Parenzan, 1981
 Cardepia helix Boursin, 1962
 Cardepia irrisoria (Erschoff, 1874)
 Cardepia kaszabi Sukhareva & Varga, 1973
 Cardepia legraini Hacker, 1998
 Cardepia martoni Hacker, 1998
 Cardepia mixta (Pagenstecher, 1907)
 Cardepia oleagina Hacker, 1998
 Cardepia sociabilis (Graslin, 1850)

References
 Cardepia at Markku Savela's Lepidoptera and Some Other Life Forms
 Natural History Museum Lepidoptera genus database

Hadenini
Moth genera